Herewald Ramsbotham Davies, OBE (1879-1957)   was Archdeacon of Tobago from 1932 until 1946.

Davies was born in Nutley, East Sussex, educated at St Augustine's College, Canterbury and ordained in 1905. After curacies in Port of Spain and  Scarborough, Tobago he was the incumbent at Caroni then Rural Dean of Tobago  until his Archdeacon’s appointment.

References

1879 births
1957 deaths
People from Wealden District
Alumni of St Augustine's College, Canterbury
Archdeacons of Tobago
Officers of the Order of the British Empire